Tô Huy Rứa (born 4 June 1947 in Thanh Hóa Province) is a Vietnamese politician and served as previous Chairman of the CPV Commission for Organisation. During the 10th Politburo, Tô held the posts of Chairman of the Propaganda Department of the Communist Party of Vietnam and Chairman of the Theoretical Council. He is a member of the 11th Politburo, in which he is ranked 7th.

Early life 
Tô Huy Rứa was born on 4 June 1947 in Quảng Xương District in Thanh Hóa Province. In 1965  
Tô Huy Rứa joined the Youth Volunteers for the battlefield. Tô Huy Rứa became member of the Communist Party of Vietnam on 6 February 1967 officially on 6 February 1968. In the early 1970s he was sent to study at the Central School of Philosophy. After graduation, he was retained as a lecturer in the Faculty of Philosophy. During his teaching career, he enrolled in additional studies and a Bachelor of Mathematics from the University of Hanoi.

In the early 1980s, he was sent to graduate studies in philosophy at the Academy of Social Sciences in the USSR, successfully defending his dissertation. After graduation, he returned to Vietnam and was appointed deputy dean of the Faculty of Philosophy, Hanoi University.

References

1947 births
Living people
Members of the 10th Politburo of the Communist Party of Vietnam
Members of the 11th Politburo of the Communist Party of Vietnam
Members of the 10th Secretariat of the Communist Party of Vietnam
Members of the 11th Secretariat of the Communist Party of Vietnam
Members of the 8th Central Committee of the Communist Party of Vietnam
Members of the 9th Central Committee of the Communist Party of Vietnam
Members of the 10th Central Committee of the Communist Party of Vietnam
Members of the 11th Central Committee of the Communist Party of Vietnam
People from Thanh Hóa province